Arzanah Island is an island is located about  northwest of Abu Dhabi and about  from Khawr al Udayd. There is no fresh water on the island, and in the past it was the headquarters of pearl fisheries. There is a modern housing complex on the island for employees of ZADCO Oil Exploration Company.

References

Islands of the Emirate of Abu Dhabi